Maia Lomineishvili (born 1977) is a Georgian chess player, and an international master.

She has won the Women's Georgian Chess Championship five times, and competed in the Women's World Chess Championship several times.

In 1991 she won the Girls' Under-14 European Youth Chess Championship.

In 2005, she played in the Georgian team which won the silver medal in the Women's European Team Chess Championship.

As of March 2014 she was ranked world no. 92 woman.

References 

Living people
Female chess players from Georgia (country)
Chess International Masters
1977 births